Craniotome is the name of a number of things:
 Craniotome (plant), a genus from the Lamiaceae
Craniotome (tool), a tool for cutting the skull